Saint-Alban is a municipality in the Capitale-Nationale region of Quebec, Canada. The place is known for its caves and crevices, and the gorge of the Sainte-Anne River. The "gorge" sector of the Sainte-Anne River is famous for its rock climbing walls.

History

The first settlers, coming from Saint-Ambroise-de-la-Jeune-Lorette, Deschambault, Grondines, and Sainte-Anne-de-la-Perade, began clearing the area around 1830. In 1851, a mill was built that led to the development of the village. In 1856, the parish was founded, followed by the post office in 1857, and the parish municipality in 1860. Its official full name was Saint-Alban-d'Alton, and named after Saint Alban, the first martyr in Britain in the third century. Alton refers to its location in the geographic township of Alton, formed in 1841, and named after a town in Hampshire, England.

In January 1918, the village centre itself separated from the parish municipality and was incorporated as the Village Municipality of Saint-Alban. In 1991, the parish and village municipalities merged again to form the new Municipality of Saint-Alban.

1894 landslide
On 27 April 1894, Canada's largest known landslide occurred in Saint-Alban. Displacing  of rock and dirt, leaving a  scar, that covered .

Demographics
Population trend:
 Population in 2011: 1225 (2006 to 2011 population change: 7.6%)
 Population in 2006: 1138
 Population in 2001: 1170
 Population in 1996: 1159
 Population in 1991: 1176

Private dwellings occupied by usual residents: 552 (total dwellings: 764)

Mother tongue:
 English as first language: 0%
 French as first language: 100%
 English and French as first language: 0%
 Other as first language: 0%

Gallery

See also
 Portneuf Regional Natural Park

Further reading
Mariages de St-Alban (comté Portneuf) 1856-1900 , compiled by Benoit Pontbriand, agronomist, 1965, 63 pages.

References

External links
  
 
 

Incorporated places in Capitale-Nationale
Municipalities in Quebec
Designated places in Quebec
Portneuf Regional County Municipality
1894 in Quebec
Landslides in 1894
1830 establishments in Lower Canada
Natural disasters in Quebec